The Calman–Hine report of 1995 examined cancer services in the United Kingdom, and proposed a restructuring of cancer services to achieve a more equitable level of access to high levels of expertise throughout the country.

See also
Cancer Research UK

References

1995 in the United Kingdom
Public inquiries in the United Kingdom